The 2018 LA Galaxy II season was the club's fifth season of existence.

Squad information

Transfers

Transfers in

Transfers out

Competitions

Friendlies

USL

Standings

Regular season 
The first two matches of the 2018 season was announced on January 12, 2018. The full schedule was released on January 19, 2018.

All times in Pacific Time Zone.

See also 
 2018 in American soccer
 2018 LA Galaxy season

References

External links 
 

LA Galaxy II seasons
LA Galaxy II
LA Galaxy II
LA Galaxy II